Miarka or Miarka: The Daughter of the Bear (French: Miarka, la fille à l'ourse) is a 1920 French silent drama film directed by Louis Mercanton and starring Ivor Novello. The film is also known by the alternative title of Gypsy Passion. It was shot on location in the Camargue region. It was based on a novel by Jean Richepin which was later turned into a sound film of the same name''.

Plot
As described in a film magazine, Romany Kate, a gypsy, and her granddaughter Miarka (Mazza) live in the abandoned ruins of an old castle and in the shadow of a modern mansion. The owner of the estate is making a study of gypsy life and writing a book on the subject. He has stolen a manuscript from Romany Kate's wagon and is having it translated. Louis, the gamekeeper, seeks Miarka's hand but Romany Kate plans to have her granddaughter marry the head of the gypsy tribe. Ivor (Novello), nephew of their wealthy benefactor, also falls in love with Miarka. Louis accuses Romany Kate of setting a fire to the mansion and she is locked up. He then attempts to drug Miarka, but her pet bear Pouzzli attacks Louis and kills him. As he dies, he confesses that stole from his employer and tried to hide the crime. Ivor is then found to be a chief of a branch of the nomads, and Romany Kate gives her consent to Miarka's marriage.

Cast
Desdemona Mazza as Miarka
Jean Mercanton
Marie Grisier-Montbazon
Ivor Novello as Ivor
Paul Numa
Jean Richepin as Lord
Gabrielle Réjane as Vougne
Charles Vanel as Mario, the game warden

References

External links

French drama films
French silent films
1920 drama films
Films directed by Louis Mercanton
Films set in France
French black-and-white films
Silent drama films
1920s French films
1920s French-language films